The discography of American country singer Jessi Colter consists of eleven studio albums, three compilation albums, twenty six singles, fourteen other appearances, and one other charted song. After marrying guitarist Duane Eddy in 1961, Colter recorded two singles and toured with Eddy until divorcing in 1968. The following year, she met country artist Waylon Jennings who helped her secure a recording contract with RCA Victor. Her debut studio album entitled A Country Star Is Born was released in 1970. The pair would collaborate on a cover of Elvis Presley's "Suspicious Minds during this time. Colter signed with Capitol Records in 1975 and released her debut single off the label "I'm Not Lisa". The song became her commercial breakthrough, reaching the number one position on the Billboard Hot Country Singles chart and crossing over to the Billboard Hot 100 where it reached the top five. That same year, Colter's second studio album I'm Jessi Colter was issued, which also produce the Top five country hit, "What's Happened to Blue Eyes." In 1976, Colter released two more studio albums: Jessi and Diamond in the Rough.

The same year, Colter also participated in the album, Wanted! The Outlaws with Tompall Glaser, Jennings, and Willie Nelson. The compilation won the Country Music Association's "Album of the Year" award and certified 2× Multi-Platinum in sales by the Recording Industry Association of America. Following two additional studio albums in the later half of the 70s (Mirriam and That's the Way a Cowboy Rocks and Rolls), Colter's popularity declined. In 1981 she returned with Jennings to record the studio album Leather and Lace. The album spawned two charting Billboard singles, including a cover of Colter's self-penned "Storms Never Last". After releasing Ridin' Shotgun in 1982, Colter left Capitol and sporadically recorded in the 1980s and 1990s. Following Jennings's death in 2002, Colter released her first studio album in over twenty years entitled Out of the Ashes, and returned to touring.

Albums

Studio albums

Compilation albums

Singles

As lead artist

As a collaborative artist

Other charted songs

Other appearances

Notes

References

External links 
 Jessi Colter discography at Discogs

Country music discographies
Discographies of American artists